Byrd White   is a West Virginia accountant and state government official. He was appointed in March 2019 by Governor Jim Justice as West Virginia's Secretary of Transportation as a replacement for Tom Smith, who Justice had fired over a dispute about maintenance of secondary roads.

White is a former Raleigh County Commissioner and highway construction company executive.

References

External links
https://governor.wv.gov/News/press-releases/2019/Pages/Gov.-Justice-announces-plans-to-fix-secondary-roads-and-refocus-Division-of-Highways-as-maintenance-first-agency.aspx
https://governor.wv.gov/News/press-releases/2019/Pages/Gov.-Justice-appoints-White-as-Secretary-of-Transportation.aspx

American accountants
Secretaries of Transportation of West Virginia
Living people
Year of birth missing (living people)
People from Raleigh County, West Virginia